Robert Aylward (1 April 1955 – 14 July 2022) was an Irish Fianna Fáil politician who served as a Teachta Dála (TD) for the Carlow–Kilkenny constituency from 2007 to 2011 and 2015 to 2020.

Politics
He was a member of Kilkenny County Council from 1992 until his election to the Dáil in 2007. He was chairperson of the Council from 2003 to 2004. He was also a Member of the Southern Fisheries Board from 2000 to 2007, the Southern and Eastern Regional Assembly from 1999 to 2004 and the Port of Waterford, from 1999 to 2004.

His brother, Liam, previously represented the same constituency for Fianna Fáil, until he retired from national politics in 2007, opting to remain in the European Parliament. Their father Bob Aylward was a Senator from 1973 until his death in 1974.

He also worked as a farmer while he was a TD.

He lost his seat at the 2011 general election, but re-gained it at a by-election in May 2015, only to lose it again in the general election in February 2020.

Personal life
Aylward was married to Helena Long; and they had two sons and one daughter. He was educated in Castlegannon National school, Scoil Aireagail vocational school and Kildalton Agricultural College. He was a member of Ballyhale Shamrocks GAA Club. Aylward died on 14 July 2022.

See also
Families in the Oireachtas

References

 

1955 births
2022 deaths
Fianna Fáil TDs
20th-century Irish farmers
Local councillors in County Kilkenny
Members of the 30th Dáil
Members of the 31st Dáil
Members of the 32nd Dáil
21st-century Irish farmers